Challenge (formerly Challenge Mills) is an unincorporated community in Yuba County, California.

A post office opened at Challenge in 1895.

Climate
According to the Köppen Climate Classification system, Challenge has a warm-summer Mediterranean climate, abbreviated "Csa" on climate maps.

References

Unincorporated communities in California
Unincorporated communities in Yuba County, California